The Gaula River, or Gola River, is a river in India originating in the Lesser Himalayas. The river is also known by the names of Kichha and Baigul (or more specifically Baigul West) in its lower course. It is mainly a spring fed river; this river is source of water for Haldwani and Kathgodam. A beautiful dam exists over this river in Kathgodam.

Mining
This is also controversial due to illegal mining,. The government plans to install remote sensor anti-theft devices,.

Ecology
Over the years, due erosion and deforestation the Gaula catchment has become prone to landslides and the springs in it and overall rainfall have declined leading to reduction in its flow. The Gaula riverbed after it hits the plain near Haldwani has also been facing erosion to excessive quarrying. When despite Supreme Court's directive which effectively banned quarrying while only allowing silt deposit removal, has led to public protests in the regions and a bandh (mass strike) in Haldwani in December 2009 by activists, alleging nexus between stone crushing and mining industry and the administration.

The steady erosion of the Gola river forest corridor threatens the survival of tigers and elephants in the Terai region,.

Gaula Dam
A barrage on this river, known as the Gaula Barrage, is located at Kathgodam. The barrage is a landmark for the local residents. It provides irrigation water for the bhabar fields.

Bridge near Haldwani-Kathgodam
Development of bridge over this river in Haldwani-Kathgodam area has been controversial for long.

Image Gallery

References

External links
 Gaula River at wikimapia

Rivers of Uttarakhand
Nainital district
Ganges basin
Rivers of India